Yulia R. Gel is a professor in the Department of Mathematical Sciences at the University of Texas at Dallas and an adjunct professor in the Department of Statistics and Actuarial Science of the University of Waterloo.

Gel earned her doctorate in mathematics at Saint Petersburg State University in Russia, under the supervision of Vladimir N. Fomin. After postdoctoral research at the University of Washington, she joined the Waterloo faculty in 2004, and moved to Dallas in 2014.

In 2014 she was elected as a Fellow of the American Statistical Association "for theoretical contributions to nonparametric aspects of spatiotemporal processes; for promoting the application of modern statistical methodologies in law, public policy, and the environmental sciences; and for championing the advancement of women and other under-represented groups in the mathematical and physical sciences."

References

External links
Google scholar profile

Year of birth missing (living people)
Living people
American statisticians
Canadian statisticians
Russian statisticians
Women statisticians
Saint Petersburg State University alumni
University of Texas at Dallas faculty
Academic staff of the University of Waterloo
Fellows of the American Statistical Association